Samuel McLean (September 12th, 1797 – March 19th, 1881),  was a United States Consul for Trinidad de Cuba from 1849 through 1855. He was appointed at Missouri.

Family 
He married Susan Wilson Smoot  of the prominent Smoot Family of Alexandria. After she died he married a Mrs Johnson of Louisiana and removed after the American Civil War to Philadelphia. 

Samuel had several children, including Alice Lawrason McLean, Lucretia Hodgkinson McLean, Alexander Kerr McLean and Virginia McLean with his first wife; and Lillie McLean, Eliza McLean and Archie McLean, with his second wife.

Death 
He died in Philadelphia, Pennsylvania, on March 19, 1881. He was buried in Alexandria.

See also
Daniel McLean, Samuel's father
Wilmer McLean, Samuel's brother

References

1797 births
1881 deaths
People from Alexandria, Virginia
American expatriates in Cuba
United States Department of State officials